Marina Malpica (born 4 January 2000) is a Mexican rhythmic gymnast. She's the first gymnast from Mexico to qualify for a final at the World Championships.

Career 
She took up the sport at age five in Veracruz. She debuted in major competitions at the 2017 Pan American Championships, where she won silver in teams and bronze in the All-Around and was 4th with hoop, 4th with ball, 7th with clubs and 7th with ribbon. In August she performed at the World Championships in Pesaro finishing 49th in the All-Around, 38th with hoop, 48th with ball, 68th with clubs and 39th with ribbon. 

In 2018 Malpica participated in the World Cup stages in Guadalajara, taking All-Around's 28th place and 25th with hoop, 35th with ball, 35th with clubs, 29th with ribbon, and Kazan ending 22nd in the All-Around. She was then selected for the Central American and Caribbean Games, she won gold with hoop and ball and silver in the All-Around and with clubs. In September she was at the World Championships in Sofia where she was 18th in teams with Karla Diaz and Rut Castillo, 68th in the All-Around, 56th with hoop, 105th with ball and 50th with clubs. And then to the Pan American Championships in Lima, she won silver in the All-Around behind Laura Zeng and bronze with hoop behind Zeng and Lili Mizuno.

The next year she competed in the World Cups in Guadalajara ( 29th in the All-Around, 28th with hoop, 26th with ball, 31st with clubs and 29th with ribbon) and Tashkent (26th in the All-Around, 27th with hoop, 24th with ball, 32nd with clubs and 25th with ribbon) and the World Championships in Baku, performing only with ribbon taking the 58th place with the apparatus and the 25th in the team competition. 

In 2021 she was a member of the Mexican team that took part at the World Championships in Kitakyushu, contributing with her ball and clubs' routines that ranked 30th and 40th respectively.

Marina debuted in 2022 at the World Cup in Portimão where she finished 26th in the All-Around, 31st with hoop, 36th with ball, 17th with clubs, 19th with ribbon. A few days later she was in Pesaro for another World Cup where she ranked 26th in the All-Around, 27th with hoop, 29th with ball, 20th with clubs, 32nd with ribbon. In August she competed at the last World Cup of the season in Cluj-Napoca, ending 26th in the All-Around, 17th with hoop, 22nd with ball, 36th with clubs, 15th with ribbon. She made history at the World Championships in Sofia by qualifying for the All-Around final, becoming the first individual from Mexico qualify for a final at the tournament, and ending 14th.

Achievements 

 First Mexican rhythmic gymnast to qualify for a World Championships final when she participated in the 2022 edition of the tournament in Sofia.

Routine music information

References 

2000 births
Living people
Mexican rhythmic gymnasts
People from Quintana Roo